Auterive is a commune in the Haute-Garonne department in southwestern France. Auterive station has rail connections to Toulouse, Foix and Latour-de-Carol. It is the seat (capital) of the canton of Auterive.

Geography
The town lies on the eastern banks of the Ariège river.

The commune is bordered by eleven other communes: Grépiac and Labruyère-Dorsa to the north, Miremont to the northwest, Auragne to the northeast, Mauvaisin to the east, Cintegabelle to the southeast, Caujac to the south, Mauressac and Grazac to the southwest, and finally by Lagrâce-Dieu and Puydaniel to the west.

Population
The inhabitants of the commune are known as Auterivains in French.

International relationships
Auterive is twinned with:
  Arenys de Mar, Spain
  Fontanelle, Italy
  Südheide, Germany

See also
Communes of the Haute-Garonne department

References

Communes of Haute-Garonne
Languedoc